Edgar Angulo (born 2 March 1953) is a Colombian footballer. He played in one match for the Colombia national football team in 1975. He was also part of Colombia's squad for the 1975 Copa América tournament.

References

External links
 

1953 births
Living people
Colombian footballers
Colombia international footballers
Place of birth missing (living people)
Association football defenders
Atlético Junior footballers
Atlético Nacional footballers